Zarrin Jub may refer to:

Zarrin Jub, Kermanshah
Zarrin Jub, Bijar, Kurdistan Province
Zarrin Jub, Kamyaran, Kurdistan Province
Zarrin Jub, Lorestan